Once Upon a Time in the Northeast is a 2017 Chinese action comedy film directed by Guo Dalei and starring Jia Nailiang, Ma Li, Wang Xun, Liang Chao, Yu Yang, Qu Jingjing, Eric Tsang and Chin Shih-chieh. It was released in China on 3 February 2017.

Plot

Cast
Jia Nailiang
Ma Li
Wang Xun
Liang Chao
Yu Yang
Qu Jingjing
Eric Tsang
Chin Shih-chieh

Reception
The film grossed  on its opening weekend in China.

References

Chinese action comedy films
2017 action comedy films
2017 comedy films